The Yelets constituency (No.102) was a Russian legislative constituency in Lipetsk Oblast in 1993–2007. The constituency covered upstate Lipetsk Oblast. In 2016 territory of the former constituency was split with northern part (including Yelets) put into Lipetsk constituency, while southern part — into new Levoberezhny constituency

Members elected

Election results

1993

|-
! colspan=2 style="background-color:#E9E9E9;text-align:left;vertical-align:top;" |Candidate
! style="background-color:#E9E9E9;text-align:left;vertical-align:top;" |Party
! style="background-color:#E9E9E9;text-align:right;" |Votes
! style="background-color:#E9E9E9;text-align:right;" |%
|-
|style="background-color:"|
|align=left|Viktor Repkin
|align=left|Independent
|
|17.65%
|-
|style="background-color:"|
|align=left|Maria Sorokina
|align=left|Independent
| -
|16.60%
|-
| colspan="5" style="background-color:#E9E9E9;"|
|- style="font-weight:bold"
| colspan="3" style="text-align:left;" | Total
| 
| 100%
|-
| colspan="5" style="background-color:#E9E9E9;"|
|- style="font-weight:bold"
| colspan="4" |Source:
|
|}

1995

|-
! colspan=2 style="background-color:#E9E9E9;text-align:left;vertical-align:top;" |Candidate
! style="background-color:#E9E9E9;text-align:left;vertical-align:top;" |Party
! style="background-color:#E9E9E9;text-align:right;" |Votes
! style="background-color:#E9E9E9;text-align:right;" |%
|-
|style="background-color:"|
|align=left|Vladimir Toporkov
|align=left|Communist Party
|
|36.74%
|-
|style="background-color:"|
|align=left|Viktor Repkin (incumbent)
|align=left|Agrarian Party
|
|12.67%
|-
|style="background-color:"|
|align=left|Galina Ivannikova
|align=left|Our Home – Russia
|
|11.75%
|-
|style="background-color:"|
|align=left|Boris Shestakov
|align=left|Independent
|
|9.00%
|-
|style="background-color:#959698"|
|align=left|Viktor Gorlov
|align=left|Derzhava
|
|7.94%
|-
|style="background-color:#DA2021"|
|align=left|Pyotr Gorlov
|align=left|Ivan Rybkin Bloc
|
|4.76%
|-
|style="background-color:#1C1A0D"|
|align=left|Pavel Yevgrafov
|align=left|Forward, Russia!
|
|3.40%
|-
|style="background-color:#C28314"|
|align=left|Abdulkhamid Mazhayev
|align=left|For the Motherland!
|
|1.57%
|-
|style="background-color:#000000"|
|colspan=2 |against all
|
|10.28%
|-
| colspan="5" style="background-color:#E9E9E9;"|
|- style="font-weight:bold"
| colspan="3" style="text-align:left;" | Total
| 
| 100%
|-
| colspan="5" style="background-color:#E9E9E9;"|
|- style="font-weight:bold"
| colspan="4" |Source:
|
|}

1999

|-
! colspan=2 style="background-color:#E9E9E9;text-align:left;vertical-align:top;" |Candidate
! style="background-color:#E9E9E9;text-align:left;vertical-align:top;" |Party
! style="background-color:#E9E9E9;text-align:right;" |Votes
! style="background-color:#E9E9E9;text-align:right;" |%
|-
|style="background-color:"|
|align=left|Vladimir Toporkov (incumbent)
|align=left|Communist Party
|
|34.04%
|-
|style="background-color:"|
|align=left|Dmitry Dvugroshev
|align=left|Independent
|
|18.33%
|-
|style="background-color:#FF4400"|
|align=left|Leonid Kovalyov
|align=left|Andrey Nikolayev and Svyatoslav Fyodorov Bloc
|
|6.67%
|-
|style="background-color:"|
|align=left|Maria Sorokina
|align=left|Independent
|
|6.50%
|-
|style="background:#1042A5"| 
|align=left|Aleksandr Yeletskikh
|align=left|Union of Right Forces
|
|6.27%
|-
|style="background-color:"|
|align=left|Aleksandr Orishev
|align=left|Liberal Democratic Party
|
|3.30%
|-
|style="background-color:"|
|align=left|Anatoly Yakovlev
|align=left|Independent
|
|3.05%
|-
|style="background-color:"|
|align=left|Boris Uvarov
|align=left|Russian All-People's Union
|
|2.57%
|-
|style="background-color:"|
|align=left|Nikolay Malygin
|align=left|Independent
|
|2.11%
|-
|style="background-color:"|
|align=left|Aleksandr Chernyshov
|align=left|Our Home – Russia
|
|1.28%
|-
|style="background-color:#084284"|
|align=left|Ruslan Krupoderov
|align=left|Spiritual Heritage
|
|1.15%
|-
|style="background-color:#000000"|
|colspan=2 |against all
|
|12.42%
|-
| colspan="5" style="background-color:#E9E9E9;"|
|- style="font-weight:bold"
| colspan="3" style="text-align:left;" | Total
| 
| 100%
|-
| colspan="5" style="background-color:#E9E9E9;"|
|- style="font-weight:bold"
| colspan="4" |Source:
|
|}

2003

|-
! colspan=2 style="background-color:#E9E9E9;text-align:left;vertical-align:top;" |Candidate
! style="background-color:#E9E9E9;text-align:left;vertical-align:top;" |Party
! style="background-color:#E9E9E9;text-align:right;" |Votes
! style="background-color:#E9E9E9;text-align:right;" |%
|-
|style="background-color:"|
|align=left|Nikolay Bortsov
|align=left|United Russia
|
|42.34%
|-
|style="background-color:"|
|align=left|Andrey Boldin
|align=left|Agrarian Party
|
|19.35%
|-
|style="background-color:"|
|align=left|Nikolay Razvorotnev
|align=left|Communist Party
|
|13.40%
|-
|style="background:#1042A5"| 
|align=left|Aleksandr Yeletskikh
|align=left|Union of Right Forces
|
|3.86%
|-
|style="background-color:"|
|align=left|Valery Dunayev
|align=left|Liberal Democratic Party
|
|3.16%
|-
|style="background-color:"|
|align=left|Yury Golik
|align=left|Independent
|
|2.68%
|-
|style="background-color:"|
|align=left|Sergey Tyurenkov
|align=left|Independent
|
|0.66%
|-
|style="background-color:#000000"|
|colspan=2 |against all
|
|11.28%
|-
| colspan="5" style="background-color:#E9E9E9;"|
|- style="font-weight:bold"
| colspan="3" style="text-align:left;" | Total
| 
| 100%
|-
| colspan="5" style="background-color:#E9E9E9;"|
|- style="font-weight:bold"
| colspan="4" |Source:
|
|}

Notes

References

Obsolete Russian legislative constituencies
Politics of Lipetsk Oblast